Nashville Ballet is a professional ballet company in Tennessee. Founded in 1986 and based in Nashville, Tennessee, it presents a repertoire of classic and contemporary works by a variety of choreographers, including Artistic Director Paul Vasterling.

The company is composed of 32 professional dancers from around the world. NB2, Nashville Ballet's official second Company, prepares aspiring dancers for a mainstage career through intensive training and performance opportunities.

History
 In 1974, a group of dancers and teachers opened the Dancers Studio, which offered ballet and other dance classes to the public, including Opryland USA theme park performers. 
 After several productions following their 1981 debut, the group evolves into Nashville City Ballet.
 Nashville City Ballet becomes a professional performance company in 1986 and hires Dane LaFontsee as its first artistic director. A year later, the company was renamed to Nashville Ballet. 
 Co-chaired by Clare Armistead and Elizabeth Nichols, the organization hosted its first Ballet Ball fundraiser, originally known as Masked Ball, in 1989. Paul Vasterling is also hired as a company member.
 In 1991, Nashville Ballet relocated to a building on Sidco Drive to provide larger rehearsal studios and expand the offerings. 
 After serving as rehearsal director, Paul Vasterling was appointed Nashville Ballet Artistic Director in 1998. 
 In 1999, the group traveled abroad for the first time to perform in Basel, Switzerland. Among other international tours, they went to Buenos Aires and other cities across Argentina.
 In 2000, the company purchased its current home on 3630 Redmon Street. The building was renovated and Nashville Ballet became the first performing arts group in Nashville to own its own building.
 Nashville Ballet reimagined The Nutcracker as Nashville’s Nutcracker by Paul Vasterling in 2008.
 In 2009, the Company debuted their first original production of Carmina Burana. 
 In 2014, Nashville Ballet launched its ELEVATE Capital Campaign to help expand their facilities. Following a large fundraising initiative, Nashville Ballet completed $5.2 million worth of expansions to the Martin Center. Following the initiative, Nashville Ballet completed $5.2 million worth of expansions to the Martin Center.
Created by the male company members and staff, Nashville Ballet launched a tuition free Young Men’s Scholarship Program in 2016.
 In 2017, the group performed at The Kennedy Center, 
 In 2019, Paul Vasterling's debuts Lucy Negro Redux on the Company and is featured in the New York Times.
 For the first time in the company's history, Nashville Ballet staged and filmed Nashville’s Nutcracker for television. The performance made its televised premiere on NewsChannel 5 WTVF, which received two TELLY Awards and an Emmy Award.

Performances
Nashville Ballet presents five to seven mainstage performances each year. The company performs at and is the resident ballet company at the Tennessee Performing Arts Center in downtown Nashville.

Nashville Ballet has performed at The Kennedy Center in Washington, D.C. in 2017 and at the Chautauqua Institution in Chautauqua, NY in 2018. The company has performed internationally in Basel, Switzerland, and Buenos Aires, Argentina. In the spring of 2022, the company will tour Paul Vasterling’s Lucy Negro Redux to Denver, Colorado, Santa Fe, New Mexico, Kansas City, Missouri, and Norfolk, Virginia.

The company presents a variety of classical and contemporary works each season. Past repertory includes works by Salvatore Aiello, Jennifer Archibald, George Balanchine, Christopher Bruce, Val Caniparoli, Jiří Kylián, José Limón, Annabelle Lopez Ochoa, Christopher Stuart, Twyla Tharp, Christopher Wheeldon, and more.

Nashville Ballet collaborates with musicians across all genres for live performances. Under the leadership of Artistic Director Paul Vasterling, Nashville Ballet has commissioned 22 original scores for brand-new ballets. The Nashville Symphony accompanies each of Nashville Ballet’s classical productions. For contemporary works, they have worked with musicians such as Ben Folds, Maren Morris, Rayland Baxter, Louis York, Sugar + The Hi-Lows, Sheryl Crow, 10 Out of Tenn, Guy Clark, Shannon Sanders, and Lockeland Strings.

Vasterling’s 2019 Lucy Negro Redux in collaboration with Rhiannon Giddens examined themes of otherness, equality, and self-worth; it was dubbed a “Nashville miracle” by The New York Times.

Education and Community Engagement
School of Nashville Ballet provides dance education for children, youth, and adults for ages 2–70. The school aims to focus on development, inclusivity, and excellence in dance by teaching the fundamental foundation of classical ballet. The Community Engagement Program brings arts education to more than 50,000 individuals each year. The company visits schools, libraries, parks and community centers to introduce new audiences to dance. The Martin Center for Nashville Ballet currently serves as a home for their professional dancers, students, and administrative offices.

Artists

Artistic Director
Named Artistic Director in 1998, Paul Vasterling is a nationally acclaimed choreographer and former Nashville Ballet Company dancer and has been with the organization since 1988.

Company dancers
There are thirty two full-time professional dancers, recruited through annual auditions. 
As of October, 2022:

Company Members
 Brett Sjoblom
 Colette Tilinski
 Garritt McCabe 
 Imani Sailers
 Marissa Stark
 Mollie Sansone
 Sarah Pierce
 Christian Renforth
 Julia Eisen
 Nicolas Scheuer
 Jaison McClendon
 Noah Miller
 Kennedy Brown
 Michael Burfield
 Jamie Kopit
 Daniel Rodriguez
 Lily Saito
 Owen Thorne 
 Claudia Monja 
 Celeste Borman
 Jasmine Wheeler
 Aeron Buchanan
 James Lankford
 Emily Ireland-Buczek

Company Apprentices
 Anneliese Guerin
 Farin Taft
 Raquel Smith 
 Joshua O'Connor
 Autumn Tierney 
 Maia Montgomery 
 Annie Bakland
 Justin Abel

References

External links

Ballet companies in the United States
Dance in Tennessee
1986 establishments in Tennessee
Performing groups established in 1986